The Voodoo Lady is an EP released by the American rock band Ween in 1994 on Flying Nun Records. It appeared on their 1994 album Chocolate and Cheese.

"Voodoo Lady"
The title track is in typical Bayou-style blues format. Chants of "Boogie boogie boogie" are pervasive throughout the song. Most of the lyrics describe a woman who supposedly is always "doing that stuff that you do", and "messing me up with your voodoo". The singer seems to be someone somehow romantically involved with the Voodoo Lady. The song slowly winds down at the end, with a final blast of sound finishing the song.

The EP's title track also appears on the band's 1994 album Chocolate and Cheese. It is also one of two Ween songs — the other being "Push th' Little Daisies" — to chart on Billboard's Modern Rock Tracks, peaking at number 32. The cover art was designed by Gene Ween.

Track listing

Promotional 7"
"Voodoo Lady"
"Buenos Tardes Amigo"
"Cover It with Gas and Set It on Fire"
Only on red 7".

Promotional CD
"Voodoo Lady" (Radio Edit)

CD
"Voodoo Lady"
"Buenos Tardes Amigo"
"There's a Pig"
"Vallejo"

Charts

References

1994 EPs
Flying Nun Records EPs
Ween EPs